Ectoedemia glycystrota is a moth of the family Nepticulidae. It was described by Edward Meyrick in 1928. It is known from Bombay, India.

References

Nepticulidae
Moths of Asia
Moths described in 1928